Chun Yuyan (1st-century BC), was a Chinese court official.  She was the obstetrician and gynecologist of empress Xu Pingjun, and has been referred to as the perhaps first woman of her profession in China.

References 

1st-century BC Chinese women
1st-century BC Chinese people
Ancient Chinese physicians
Ancient women scientists
Chinese gynaecologists
Chinese obstetricians
1st-century BC physicians